Table tennis at the 2020 Summer Olympics in Tokyo  featured 173 table tennis players. Table tennis had appeared at the Summer Olympics on eight previous occasions beginning with the 1988 Summer Olympics.

Qualification

As the host nation, Japan had automatically qualified six athletes; a team of three men and women with one each competing in the singles as well as a mixed doubles team.

For the team events, 16 teams were qualified. Each continent (with the Americas being divided into North America and South America for ITTF competition) had a qualifying competition to qualify one team. Nine teams qualified through a world qualifying event.

The mixed doubles also had 16 pairs qualify. Each continent (with the Americas being divided into North America and South America for ITTF competition) had a qualifying competition to qualify one pair. Four teams qualified through the World Tour Grand Finals 2019 and five through the World Tour 2020. Japan was also guaranteed a place. If an NOC had both a mixed doubles pair and a team in one or both genders qualify, the doubles player must be a member of the team in their gender.

For individual events, between 64 and 70 individual players qualified. Each NOC with a qualified team were permitted to enter two members of that team in the individual competition. 22 quota places would be awarded through continental championships to individuals who belong to an NOC without a qualified team. There would be one Tripartite Commission invitation place. The remainder of the total 172 quota places would be filled through a final world singles qualifying tournament (no less than two and no more than eight qualifiers) and then the ITTF world ranking.

Competition schedule

Participating nations
A total of 173 athletes (85 men and 88 women), representing 57 NOCs, competed in five events. One Czech athlete tested positive for COVID-19 and withdrew from the Games. Two NOCs (China and Hungary) replaced injured athletes with reserves in the team event.

Medal summary

Medal table

Medalists

See also 
 Table tennis at the 2018 Asian Games
 Table tennis at the 2018 Summer Youth Olympics
 Table tennis at the 2019 European Games 
 Table tennis at the 2019 Pan American Games
 Table tennis at the 2020 Summer Paralympics

References

External links
 Results Books : Tokyo 2020. The Tokyo Organising Committee of the Olympic and Paralympic Games. (2021).
 Tokyo 2020 Olympic Games. ITTF.
 Table Tennis at the 2020 Summer Olympics. Olympedia.

 
Table tennis competitions in Japan
2020
2020 Summer Olympics events
Olympics